Spinocalanidae is a family of copepods belonging to the order Calanoida.

Genera

Genera:
 Arctokonstantius
 Damkaeria Fosshagen, 1983
 Foxtonia Hulsemann & Grice, 1963

References

Copepods